Burma, now known as Myanmar, participated in the 1951 Asian Games held in the city of New Delhi, India from 4 March 1951 to 11 March 1951. This country is ranked 8th with 3 bronze medals in this edition of the Asiad.

Medal summary

Medal table

Medalists

References

Nations at the 1951 Asian Games
1951
Asian Games